Beyond Frontiers is the third book in a series from satellite owner and operator Société Européenne des Satellites describing the past, current and future of the development of satellite broadcasting as well as the current business of the company and its strategy. The book was published in 2016, following predecessors High Above (2010) which detailed the history of the company and of satellite broadcasting, and Even Higher (2012) which looked at the future of broadcasting.

It is a large "coffee table" style book (32 x 24 cm) of 113 pages with hundreds of photographs.

Content 
Beyond Frontiers tells the story of SES' technological and commercial innovations and how these are applied in the industry today, providing an in-depth look at the current status of satellite television and data broadcasting from the perspective of SES.

In the first part, The Race to Space, and Innovating Technology, the author reviews the technological breakthroughs that are redefining the satellite industry. These include:

 Next generation rockets such as the Falcon 9 reusable launch system from SpaceX (in 2013 SES-8 became the first geostationary satellite to be launched by Falcon 9 ) and the Chinese Long March
 Electric spacecraft propulsion (as fitted to the SES-12, SES-14 and SES-15 satellites (due for launch in 2017),
 Digital signal processors used to reduce the component count onboard satellites and so improve the weight and reliability of the craft, the modular design of satellites to reduce the time and cost of construction
 The extension of satellites' lifespan by in-orbit refuelling, payload exchange and even repair
 The O3b constellation of medium Earth orbit satellites that delivers high speed digital connectivity to 180 countries across Latin America, Africa, the Middle East, Asia and the Pacific and is now owned by SES.

Part two Transcending Markets, and Building New Businesses explores SES commercial strategy, and how it has adapted technologies and used technological innovations to create new connectivity solutions, describing each of its four vertical markets:

 Video - including case studies on Fashion One's Fashion 4K channel, Fox Networks Group's use of MX1 (now part of SES Video), and CWG's media platform for West Africa
 Enterprise - with case studies on M2M connectivity for Italy's Gestore Servizi Energetici, Facebook's Express Wifi programme in sub-Saharan Africa, and Digicel in the Caribbean, Central America, and Oceania
 Mobility - with case studies on Global Eagle Entertainment's maritime and in-flight connectivity, Royal Caribbean International's on-board internet access, and NSSL Global's internet connectivity for cargo ships
 Government - with case studies on hosted payloads for the European Geostationary Navigation Overlay Service on the Astra 5B and SES-5 satellites, the U.S. Army's TROJAN and THULE networks, and the e-learning project in the Zaatari refugee camp in Jordon

Excerpts from Beyond Frontiers 
 Satellites are shaping a new age of mobility. New satellite technologies are covering the globe in layers of high-powered, ubiquitous bandwidth, capable of connecting both planes in the sky and ships at sea. As global IP traffic will nearly triple over the next five years, and by 2020 smartphones are expected to generate 30% of the total IP traffic, global satellite ubiquity is on the verge of exploding into a new realm of possibilities.
 While forecasting the future is a task for the foolish, it is true that SES will remain a pioneer in using the best of these emerging technologies to rewrite space and satellite history and renew mankind's access to space.
 Access to data that powers education, health services, security and opportunity is a vital capability for everyone, not simply those with greater means. Satellite communications is a key enabler toward connecting those who are unconnected, bridging the digital divide and most importantly, enabling security and protection for those who need it most.
 With up to 1.6 Gbps of throughput per beam and very low latency of less than 150 ms, O3b is delivering a unique and extremely elastic combination of satellite capacity, performance and scalability.
 The fundamental shifts in the video ecosystem demand a holistic view of the service chain and the related necessary capabilities to serve customers.
 Within this context [increasing demand for internet connectivity], satellite services are growing in relevance to address the global Internet Protocol (IP) traffic explosion, as they provide a reach that can truly reduce the connectivity gap.
 Satellites play a spectacular role as vehicles and probes of progress, as key agents to go beyond accustomed frontiers and set the vanishing points for future science and technology.

Author 
Beyond Frontiers is written by Chris Forrester, a well known United Kingdom broadcasting journalist and industry consultant.

See also 

 High Above
 Even Higher
 SES 
 O3b Networks
 Astra 
 Communications satellite
 Satellite television
 Satellite Internet access

References

External links 
 Highlights of SES history
 SES website
 O3b website

2016 non-fiction books
Books about television